Tarkington is a surname. 

Tarkington may also refer to:

Tarkington or Tarkington Prairie, Texas, an unincorporated community in Texas
Tarkington (automobile), an American automobile